John N. Smith OC (born July 31, 1943 in Montreal, Quebec) is a Canadian film director and screenwriter.

Career
Smith graduated with a B.A. in political science from McGill University in 1964. He joined the Canadian Broadcasting Corporation in 1968 as producer of The Way It Is, and the National Film Board of Canada in 1972 as a producer and director. In 1981 he directed First Winter, a short period drama that went on to be nominated for an Academy Award. He then made a string of feature-length docudramas that earnestly probed issues such as male sexuality (The Masculine Mystique), teen pregnancy (Sitting in Limbo), and immigration (Welcome to Canada). With collaborators such as Giles Walker, Smith made economic use of non-professional actors and documentary techniques. In 1993, he filmed The Boys of St. Vincent, a powerful and controversial television two-part drama depicting the sexual violation of children in a Catholic orphanage. Excellent reviews and ratings in the United States led to Hollywood assignments.

His work has been nominated in the Academy Awards, Genie Awards, and Gemini Awards, but has only won the latter. He is best known for the 1995 drama Dangerous Minds, starring Michelle Pfeiffer, the TV movie The Boys of St. Vincent, and his work on the TV miniseries The Englishman's Boy. Smith was appointed an Officer of the Order of Canada in 2008. He is married to filmmaker Cynthia Scott.

Selected filmography
Happiness Is Loving Your Teacher (short film, 1977)
Revolution's Orphans (short film, 1979)
Gala (1982)
The Masculine Mystique (1984)
Sitting in Limbo (1986)
Train of Dreams (1987)
Welcome to Canada (1989)
The Boys of St. Vincent (TV movie, 1992)
Dieppe (TV miniseries, 1993)
Dangerous Minds (1995)
A Cool, Dry Place (1998)
Random Passage (TV miniseries, 2002)
Geraldine's Fortune (2004)
Prairie Giant: The Tommy Douglas Story (TV miniseries, 2006)
The Englishman's Boy (TV miniseries, 2008)
Love and Savagery (2009)

References

External links
John N. Smith archives at the Clara Thomas Archives and Special Collections, York University Libraries, Toronto, Ontario

Watch films by John N. Smith at NFB.ca

Officers of the Order of Canada
1943 births
Living people
Canadian male screenwriters
Canadian film editors
Film producers from Quebec
Film directors from Montreal
Writers from Montreal
National Film Board of Canada people
Canadian television directors
Anglophone Quebec people
20th-century Canadian screenwriters
20th-century Canadian male writers
21st-century Canadian screenwriters
21st-century Canadian male writers